Ron Clark (born November 1, 1969) is a retired American sprinter who specialized in the 200 metres.

Clark broke through in 1994 by winning the 200 metre dash at the USA Outdoor Track and Field Championships. He also finished fourth at the 1994 IAAF World Cup, eighth at the 1994 Goodwill Games and sixth at the 1995 Pan American Games, and also won a silver medal in the 4 × 100 metres relay at the same games.

His personal best time was 20.47 seconds, achieved in July 1994 in Gateshead. He also had 10.21 seconds in the 100 metres, achieved in June 1994 in Knoxville. He was furthermore clocked in 9.8 seconds with hand timing in May 1995 in Houston.

References

1969 births
Living people
American male sprinters
Pan American Games medalists in athletics (track and field)
Pan American Games silver medalists for the United States
Athletes (track and field) at the 1995 Pan American Games
Medalists at the 1995 Pan American Games